Arkforce was an ad hoc formation of the British Expeditionary Force during the Battle of France in 1940.

Background

At the start of the Battle of France, the 51st (Highland) Infantry Division was on detachment from the rest of the BEF, having been reinforced, to man part of the Maginot Line under French command. After being withdrawn and sent west, the division was attached to IX Corps of the French Tenth Army in Normandy along the lower reaches of the river Somme. Command of the corps was given to Major-General Victor Fortune of the Highland Division, who was under the command of General Robert Altmayer the Tenth Army commander. After almost continuous fighting against a German bridgehead on the south bank at Abbeville, the division was ordered to retreat on 7 June, to a  defensive line along the river Bresle. When the second German offensive  (Case Red) reached the area the next day, the 5th Panzer Division outflanked the Bresle position at Rouen, leaving the Highlanders and the French 31st Division cut off from their line of retreat across the River Seine. Fortune decided to ignore orders from Altmayer and the War Office to retire towards the Seine (through an area now occupied by several German divisions) and to head for the port of Le Havre, taking the rest of IX Corps with him.

Formation and role

The units grouped into Arkforce were near Arques-la-Bataille and its name was derived from village. It was also charged with providing the reconnaissance for a line of defence closer to Le Havre, to aid the evacuation.

Operations
Due to congested roads, units were late arriving and elements of the 7th Panzer Division were already driving between Arkforce and the rest of IX Corps. Arkforce moved on the night of  towards Fécamp, where most had passed through before the 7th Panzer Division arrived. A Brigade managed to force its way out but lost the wireless truck intended to keep contact with the 51st (Highland) Division. The possibility of holding a line from Fécamp to Lillebonne was discounted and Stanley-Clarke ordered Arkforce on to Le Havre.

A hasty plan was made to block Dieppe harbour and on 10 June,  (Captain G. A. Garnon-Williams) escorted three blockships to the port. Two ships were sunk in the approach channel but the third ship hit a mine just outside, which prevented it being sunk at the entrance to the inner harbour. (James had signalled that many IX Corps troops would probably be trapped against the sea near St. Valery, where he had assembled flotillas of smaller craft under the local Senior Naval Officer.) Beach parties landed at Le Havre to take control of the evacuation on 10 June and after a postponement, the evacuation began on 11 June, hindered somewhat by the damage to the port caused by  bombing. The troopship , was hit and beached and the electric power to the docks was cut, rendering the cranes on the docks useless; ramps were tried for vehicle loading but it was too slow. On 12 June, RAF fighters began patrolling the port to deter raids. An attempt was made to save the transport and equipment by diverting it over the Seine, via the ferry crossings at Caudebec or to the ships at Quillebeuf at the river mouth. The quartermaster of the 14th Battalion, Royal Fusiliers succeeded in getting his transport away.

Order of battle
Arkforce Data from Joslen (2003) unless indicated.
 154th Brigade, 51st Highland Division (acting Brigadier D. J. Grant MC)
 4th Battalion, The Black Watch
 7th Battalion, The Argyll & Sutherland Highlanders
 8th Battalion, The Argyll & Sutherland Highlanders
 "A" Brigade, Beauman Division (Brigadier M. A. Green), attached to 51st Highland Division, 9 June 1940
 4th Battalion, The Border Regiment
 1/5th Battalion, The Sherwood Foresters
 4th Battalion, The Buffs (East Kent Regiment)
 Divisional units
 1st Battalion, Princess Louise's Kensington Regiment (less two companies)
 6th Battalion, The Royal Scots Fusiliers (Pioneers)
 17th Field Regiment, Royal Artillery
 75th (Highland) Field Regiment, Royal Artillery
 204 (Oban) Anti-Tank Battery, Royal Artillery
 51st (Midland) Medium Regiment, Royal Artillery (without guns)
 236th Field Company, Royal Engineers
 237th Field Company, Royal Engineers
 239th Field Park Company, Royal Engineers
 213th Army Field Company, Royal Engineers
 154th Field Ambulance, Royal Army Medical Corps
 Detachments from 525, 526 and 527 companies Royal Army Service Corps

Notes

References

 
 
 
 
 
 

Military units and formations established in 1940
Military units and formations disestablished in 1940
Ad hoc units and formations of the British Army